Schönbein is a German surname. Notable people with the surname include:

Christian Friedrich Schönbein (1799–1868), German-Swiss chemist
Irene Schönbein, wife of Josef Mengele

See also
19992 Schönbein, a main belt asteroid
Samuel Sheinbein (born 1980), American convicted murderer

German-language surnames